The Governor of Chaco is a citizen of the Chaco Province, in Argentina, holding the office of governor for the corresponding period. The governor is elected alongside a vice-governor. The current governor of Chaco is Jorge Capitanich, since 10 December 2019; Capitanich previously held the post from 2007 to 2013 and from February to December 2015.

Governors since 1983

See also
 Chamber of Deputies of Chaco

References

Chaco
Chaco Province